The Karp class were a class of submarines built by Krupp Germaniawerft for the Imperial Russian Navy. The class, composed of three boats were ordered in the 1904 emergency programme as a result of the Russo-Japanese War. The design was a twin hull type powered by a kerosene-electric power plant with a  diving limit. The boats were delivered late for the war and transferred to the Black Sea Fleet by rail in 1908. In 1909, Kambala was lost. The other two submarines remained in service until their withdrawal in March 1917. They were taken over in April 1918 by the Ukrainian State before being captured by the German Empire in May and transferred to the British following the German surrender in November. The British scuttled Karp and Karas in 1919 to prevent their capture by the Soviets.

Description
They had a complement of 28 officers and ratings. The submarines were designed to be deconstructed for rail transport.

The submarines were powered by a kerosene-electric power plant driving two shafts. The shafts were of the fixed-revolution type and turned variable pitch propellers. Kerosene was chosen over gasoline as the fuel choice due to its better safety record.

They were armed with one  torpedo tube and two external Drzewiecki drop collars for torpedoes. The ballast and fuel tanks were located between the two hulls. The design served as the prototype for the first German U-boat, which was commissioned into the Imperial German Navy on 14 December 1906. U-1 has been preserved, and is currently on display at the Deutsches Museum in Munich.

Boats in class

Service history
Three submarines were ordered as part of the 1904 emergency building programme as part of the naval buildup of the Russo-Japanese War on 30 April 1904. A German design build and constructed in the German Empire, delivery of the engines led to construction delays, with the first submarine of the class only able to perform sea trials with her electric motors. The Karp class was only delivered to Russia in 1907, with the commissioning ceremony held at Kiel attended by Prince Dolgorukov. The submarines were transferred by rail to the Black Sea in 1908 and joined the Black Sea Fleet in anticipation of conflict with the Ottoman Empire. Further issues arose for the class when it was found that the rail deconstruction feature led to corrosion. The flanges, nuts and bolts that held the sections of the hull together corroded quickly in salt water which led to weakened hulls. By 1914, the submarines were instructed not to dive below . After joining the Black Sea Fleet, all three submarines of the Karp class were made part of a training squadron based at Sevastopol. The squadron would remain relatively unchanged until World War I.

Kambala sank in 1909. The reason and location of this sinking is unclear. Some reports have the submarine sinking near Kronstadt due to an erroneously opened valve while others have her sinking in an accidental collision with the  near Sevastopol on 11 June. In the Sevastopol sinking, 20 crew perished with only the commanding officer, who had been topside saved. It has even been suggested that she sank twice first near Kronstadt then after being salvaged was sunk again near Sevastopol. Parts of the wreck were raised later in 1909 and broken up for scrap.

Karp and Karas remained in service throughout World War I until March 1917 when they were withdrawn from service and hulked at Sevastopol. After Romania's entry into the war on the side of the Allies, the submarines were based at Constanța in August 1916. They were withdrawn before the fall of the city to the Central Powers in October 1916. In April 1918, they were briefly taken over by the Ukrainian State before being captured by the German Empire in May. With the German surrender in November 1918, the submarines were turned over to the British. The submarines remained at Sevastopol during the Russian Civil War until 26 April 1919, when they were scuttled to prevent their capture by the Soviets.

Notes

Citations

Sources

External links
 
  КОРАБЛІ УКРАЇНСЬКОЇ ФЛОТИ (1917 - 1918 рр.) - Ukrainian Navy (1917-1918)
 Ukrainian Navy: ferial excursions into the past and present

Submarine classes
Submarines of the Imperial Russian Navy
 
Russian and Soviet navy submarine classes